Yagodnoye is a rural locality (a settlement) in Barnaul, Altai Krai, Russia. The population was 1,188 as of 2013. There are 10 streets.

Geography 
Yagodnoye is located 22 km southwest of Barnaul by road. Tsentralny is the nearest rural locality.

References 

Rural localities in Barnaul urban okrug